Dierdré "Dee" Anne Snijman is a South African botanist and plant taxonomist who is notable for studying and writing extensively on bulbs.  She has described over 120 species and has written comprehensive works on South African flora.  She received the 1997 Herbert Medal from the International Bulb Society for her research on Amaryllis.

Early life and career
Snijman was born in a small town east of Johannesburg, South Africa and early on adopted the name "Dee" as easier to spell and pronounce. She was educated at Blessed Imelda Convent in Brakpan and at Damelin College in Johannesburg. Her initial interest in South African flowers was sparked by her parents' garden and the illustrations by Cythna Letty and Aruiol Batten. She completed her BSc (Botany and Mathematics) at the University of Natal. She obtained her MSc in 1973 and at the same time a Diploma in Education. Teaching proved to be not to her liking as proven by "a year of teaching unruly children."

In 1974 she joined the Compton herbarium at the Kirstenbosch Botanical Gardens where she encountered the work of several South African botanists, including Robert Harold Compton. W.F. Barker had completed a collection of monocots there prior to her retirement. Peter Goldblatt and John Rourke guided her early work. She and Pauline Perry made many field trips in the Southern African winter-rainfall region.

In 1984 she published the Genus Haemanthus in conjunction with the botanical artist Ellaphie Ward-Hilhorst, and this was followed work on Hessea and Strumaria, which formed part of her Ph.D. degree.

Works

References 

Living people
South African women botanists
20th-century South African botanists
Year of birth missing (living people)
20th-century South African women scientists
21st-century South African botanists
21st-century South African women scientists
University of Natal alumni
University of Cape Town alumni